Walter Clifford may refer to:

Walter de Clifford (died 1190)
Walter de Clifford (died 1221)
Walter de Clifford (died 1263)
Sir Walter Clifford, 4th Baronet (1852–1944), of the Clifford baronets

See also
Clifford (surname)